Yağmurtepe is a village in the Siirt District of Siirt Province in Turkey. The village had a population of 277 in 2021.

The hamlets of Demirli, Kutluca, Oğulcuk and Yüklüce are attached to the village.

References 

Villages in Siirt District
Kurdish settlements in Siirt Province